Woodwardia fimbriata, known by the common name giant chain fern, is a fern species in the family Blechnaceae, in the eupolypods II clade of the order Polypodiales, in the class Polypodiopsida. It is native to western North America from British Columbia through California, including the Sierra Nevada, into Baja California.

It grows in coniferous forests and other moist wooded habitat.

Description
Woodwardia fimbriata has very long fronds, each reaching 1 to 3 meters in length. Its sori are short but broad and are arranged in neat lines, the characteristic that gives the chain ferns their name. The chain shape is visible on both sides of each leaflet.

Cultivation
Woodwardia fimbriata is cultivated as an ornamental plant for traditional and native plant gardens, and in natural landscaping and habitat restoration projects. It is a recipient of the Royal Horticultural Society's Award of Garden Merit.

References

External links
Woodwardia fimbriata - U.C. Photo gallery

Blechnaceae
Garden plants of North America
Flora of British Columbia
Flora of Washington (state)
Flora of Oregon
Flora of the Southwestern United States
Flora of Baja California